The 1995 New Hampshire Wildcats football team was an American football team that represented the University of New Hampshire as a member of the New England Division of the Yankee Conference during the 1995 NCAA Division I-AA football season. In its 24th year under head coach Bill Bowes, the team compiled a 6–5 record (5–5 against conference opponents) and finished in third place in the New England Division.

Schedule

References

New Hampshire
New Hampshire Wildcats football seasons
New Hampshire Wildcats football